Dietmar Eisold (18 September 1947 – 26 May 2017) was a German journalist and art historian.

Life 
He then studied art education and history.

From 1971 to 1991, Eisold was editor for the area of fine arts at the newspaper Neues Deutschland, the Zentralorgan of the Sozialistische Einheitspartei Deutschlands (SED).

After the Peaceful Revolution, he concentrated his activity as an author and editor on lexicographical documentation of visual art and artists of the GDR.

Eisold died in Berlin at the age of 69.

Publications 
 Das Denkmalsensemble für das Marx-Engels-Forum. In Bildende Kunst, Nr. 3, 1986, 
 Lexikon Kunst der DDR. Vol. 1, Homilius, Berlin 2008, .
 Lexikon Kunst der DDR. Vol., Homilius, Berlin 2008, .
 Lexikon Künstler in der DDR – ein Projekt der Gesellschaft zum Schutz von Bürgerrecht und Menschenwürde e.V. Neues Leben, Berlin 2010, .

References

External links 

20th-century German journalists
21st-century German journalists
German art historians
German publishers (people)
German lexicographers
Writers from Leipzig
1947 births
2017 deaths